Cheiracanthium, commonly called yellow sac spiders, is a genus of araneomorph spiders in the family Cheiracanthiidae, and was first described by Carl Ludwig Koch in 1839. They are usually pale in colour, and have an abdomen that can range from yellow to beige. They are unique among common house spiders because their tarsi do not point either outward, like members of Tegenaria, or inward, like members of Araneus), making them easier to identify. The name is a reference to the backwardly directed process on the cymbium of the male palp. The species epithet is derived from the Greek , meaning "hand", and Acanthium, a genus of thorny-stemmed plants.

Venom 
Though they are beneficial predators in agricultural fields, they are also known to be mildly venomous to humans. Painful bites may be incurred from species such as C. punctorium in Europe, C. mildei in Europe and North America, C. inclusum in the Americas, C. lawrencei in South Africa and C. japonicum in Japan. Cheiracanthium venom is purportedly necrotic, and can cause pain, swelling, and lesions in humans, but the necrotic nature and severity of its bite has been disputed. A study of twenty confirmed Cheiracanthium bites in the United States and Australia found that none resulted in necrosis.

Misconceptions 
A theory that these spiders were attracted to the smell of gasoline was involved in a series of consumer vehicle callbacks in which spiderwebs had blocked fuel lines, but it has since been disproven by a study which found that the juvenile yellow sac spiders were attracted to the hose material itself.

Species 
Cheiracanthium is primarily an Old World genus, with many species found from northern Europe to Japan, from Southern Africa to India and Australia. The only known species in the New World are C. inclusum and C. mildei. While the former also occurs in Africa and Réunion, the latter is found in the Holarctic region and Argentina. They can also be found in the lower mainland of British Columbia, Canada. The genus is quite diverse in Africa and at least three or four species are known to occur in Egyptian cotton fields alone.  it contains 214 species, found in the Caribbean, South America, Oceania, Europe, Central America, Africa, Asia, North America, and on Saint Helena:

C. abbreviatum Simon, 1878 – France, Denmark
C. aculeatum Simon, 1884 – Africa
C. aden Lotz, 2007 – Yemen
C. adjacens O. Pickard-Cambridge, 1885 – China (Yarkand), Karakorum
C. africanum Lessert, 1921 – Africa, Madagascar, Réunion
C. aizwalense Biswas & Biswas, 2007 – India
C. aladanense Lotz, 2007 – Yemen
C. albidulum (Blackwall, 1859) – Madeira
C. algarvense Wunderlich, 2012 – Portugal, Spain
C. ambrense Lotz, 2014 – Madagascar
C. ampijoroa Lotz, 2014 – Madagascar
C. andamanense (Tikader, 1977) - India
C. andranomay Lotz, 2014 – Madagascar
C. angolense Lotz, 2007 – Angola, Zimbabwe, South Africa
C. angulitarse Simon, 1878 – Spain, France (Corsica), Italy, Hungary, Romania
C. anjozorobe Lotz, 2014 – Madagascar
C. annulipes O. Pickard-Cambridge, 1872 – Spain, Egypt, Israel
C. antungense Chen & Huang, 2012 – Taiwan
C. apia Platnick, 1998 – Samoa
C. approximatum O. Pickard-Cambridge, 1885 – China (Yarkand)
C. ashleyi Lotz, 2014 – Madagascar
C. auenati Caporiacco, 1936 – Libya
C. auriculatum Zhang, Zhang & Yu, 2018 – China
C. bantaengi Merian, 1911 – Indonesia (Sulawesi)
C. barbarum (Lucas, 1846) – Algeria
C. boendense Lotz, 2015 – Congo
C. brevidens Kroneberg, 1875 – Central Asia
C. brevispinum Song, Feng & Shang, 1982 – China, Korea
C. buri Esyunin & Efimik, 202 - Russia
C. campestre Lohmander, 1944 – Sweden, Denmark, [[Central Europe]], Romania, Ukraine, Russia (Europe)
C. canariense Wunderlich, 1987 – Canary Is., Turkey, Egypt
C. catindigae Barrion & Litsinger, 1995 – Philippines
C. caudatum (Thorell, 1887) – Myanmar
C. chayuense Li & Zhang, 2019 - China
C. conflexum Simon, 1906 – India
C. conspersum (Thorell, 1891) – India (Nicobar Is.)
C. crucigerum Rainbow, 1920 – Australia (Norfolk Is.)
C. danieli Tikader, 1975 – India
C. daofeng Yu & Li, 2020 - China
C. daquilium Barrion & Litsinger, 1995 – Indonesia, Philippines
C. debile Simon, 1890 – Chad, Yemen
C. denisi Caporiacco, 1939 – Ethiopia, Congo
C. dippenaarae Lotz, 2007 – South Africa
C. duanbi Yu & Li, 2020 - China
C. echinulatum Zhang, Zhang & Yu, 2018 – China
C. effossum Herman, 1879 – Central to eastern Europe
C. elegans Thorell, 1875 – Europe, Turkey, Caucasus, Russia (Europe to south Siberia), Kazakhstan, Central Asia
C. equestre O. Pickard-Cambridge, 1874 – Libya, Egypt
C. erraticum (Walckenaer, 1802) – Europe, Turkey, Caucasus, Russia (Europe to Far East), Iran, Central Asia, China, Korea, Japan
C. escaladae Barrion, Barrion-Dupo & Heong, 2013 – China
C. eutittha Bösenberg & Strand, 1906 – Taiwan, Japan, Korea?
C. exilipes (Lucas, 1846) – Algeria
C. exquestitum Zhang & Zhu, 1993 – China
C. falcatum Chen, Huang, Chen & Wang, 2006 – Taiwan
C. falcis Lotz, 2015 – Gabon
C. festae Pavesi, 1895 – Israel
C. fibrosum Zhang, Hu & Zhu, 1994 – China
C. filiapophysium Chen & Huang, 2012 – Taiwan
C. fisheri Lotz, 2014 – Madagascar
C. floresense Wunderlich, 2008 – Azores
C. foordi Lotz, 2015 – South Africa
C. foulpointense Lotz, 2014 – Madagascar
C. fujianense Gong, 1983 – China
C. fulvotestaceum Simon, 1878 – France
C. furax L. Koch, 1873 – Samoa
C. furculatum Karsch, 1879 – Cape Verde Is., Africa, Madagascar, Comoros
C. ghanaense Lotz, 2015 – Ghana
C. gobi Schmidt & Barensteiner, 2000 – China
C. gou Yu & Li, 2020 - China
C. gracile L. Koch, 1873 – Australia (Queensland, New South Wales)
C. gratum Kulczyński, 1897 – Germany, Hungary
C. griswoldi Lotz, 2014 – Madagascar
C. halophilum Schmidt & Piepho, 1994 – Cape Verde Is.
C. haroniense Lotz, 2007 – Zimbabwe
C. himalayense Gravely, 1931 – India
C. hypocyrtum Zhang & Zhu, 1993 – China
C. ienisteai Sterghiu, 1985 – Romania, Albania
C. ilicis Morano & Bonal, 2016 – Spain
C. impressum Thorell, 1881 – Australia (Queensland)
C. incertum O. Pickard-Cambridge, 1869 – Sri Lanka
C. inclusum (Hentz, 1847) – North America, Central America, Caribbean, South America. Introduced to Réunion
C. incomptum (Thorell, 1891) – India (Nicobar Is.)
C. indicum O. Pickard-Cambridge, 1874 – India, Sri Lanka
C. inflatum Wang & Zhang, 2013 – China
C. inornatum O. Pickard-Cambridge, 1874 – India
C. insigne O. Pickard-Cambridge, 1874 – India, Sri Lanka, Thailand, Myanmar, Laos, China
C. insulare L. Koch, 1866 – Samoa
C. insulare (Vinson, 1863) – Madagascar, Réunion
C. iranicum Esyunin & Zamani, 2020 - Iran
C. isiacum O. Pickard-Cambridge, 1874 – Libya, Egypt
C. itakeum Barrion & Litsinger, 1995 – Philippines
C. jabalpurense Majumder & Tikader, 1991 – India
C. japonicum Bösenberg & Strand, 1906 – China, Korea, Japan
C. jocquei Lotz, 2014 – Comoros, Madagascar
C. joculare Simon, 1910 – São Tomé and Príncipe
C. jorgeense Wunderlich, 2008 – Azores
C. jovium Denis, 1947 – Egypt
C. kabalense Lotz, 2015 – Uganda
C. kakamega Lotz, 2015 – Kenya
C. kakumense Lotz, 2015 – Ivory Coast, Ghana, Congo
C. kashmirense Majumder & Tikader, 1991 – India
C. kazachstanicum Ponomarev, 2007 – Kazakhstan
C. kenyaense Lotz, 2007 – Africa
C. kibonotense Lessert, 1921 – Ethiopia, Congo, Kenya, Tanzania, Uganda
C. klabati Merian, 1911 – Indonesia (Sulawesi)
C. knipperi Lotz, 2011 – Tanzania
C. kupense Lotz, 2007 – Cameroon
C. lascivum Karsch, 1879 – Russia (Sakhalin), China, Korea, Japan
C. leucophaeum Simon, 1897 – Madagascar
C. ligawsolanum Barrion & Litsinger, 1995 – Philippines
C. liplikeum Barrion & Litsinger, 1995 – Philippines
C. liuyangense Xie, Yin, Yan & Kim, 1996 – China
C. longimanum L. Koch, 1873 – Australia (Queensland), Tonga, Fiji, Vanuatu, New Caledonia
C. longipes (Thorell, 1890) – Indonesia (Sumatra)
C. ludovici Lessert, 1921 – Congo, Kenya, Tanzania, Madagascar
C. lukiense Lotz, 2015 – Congo
C. macedonicum Drensky, 1921 – Italy, Slovenia, Slovakia, Hungary, Romania, Macedonia, Bulgaria
C. madagascarense Lotz, 2014 – Comoros, Madagascar
C. mahajanga Lotz, 2014 – Madagascar
C. malkini Lotz, 2007 – Nigeria
C. mangiferae Workman, 1896 – Singapore, Indonesia (Sumatra)
C. maraisi Lotz, 2007 – Namibia, Botswana
C. margaritae Sterghiu, 1985 – Romania
C. mayombense Lotz, 2015 – Congo
C. melanostomum (Thorell, 1895) – India, Bangladesh, Myanmar
C. mertoni Strand, 1911 – Indonesia (Aru Is.)
C. mildei L. Koch, 1864 – Europe, North AfricaEurope, North Africa, Turkey, Middle East, Caucasus, Russia (Europe) to Central Asia. Introduced to North America, Argentina
C. minahassae Merian, 1911 – Indonesia (Sulawesi)
C. minshullae Lotz, 2007 – Zimbabwe, Botswana, South Africa
C. molle L. Koch, 1875 – Africa, Saudi Arabia
C. mondrainense Main, 1954 – Australia (Western Australia)
C. mongolicum Schenkel, 1963 – Mongolia
C. montanum L. Koch, 1877 – Europe, Turkey, Caucasus, Iran
C. murinum (Thorell, 1895) – India, Myanmar
C. mysorense Majumder & Tikader, 1991 – India, Bangladesh
C. nalsaroverense Patel & Patel, 1973 – India
C. nervosum Simon, 1909 – Australia (Western Australia)
C. nickeli Lotz, 2011 – Mauritania
C. ningmingense Zhang & Yin, 1999 – China
C. occidentale L. Koch, 1882 – Spain (Minorca), Italy
C. olliforme Zhang & Zhu, 1993 – China
C. oncognathum Thorell, 1871 – Europe
C. pallidum Rainbow, 1920 – Australia (Lord Howe Is.)
C. pauriense Majumder & Tikader, 1991 – India
C. pelasgicum (C. L. Koch, 1837) – Southern and eastern Europe, Turkey, Caucasus, Russia (Europe) to Tajikistan
C. pennatum Simon, 1878 – Southern Europe, Romania
C. pennuliferum Simon, 1909 – Australia (Western Australia)
C. pennyi O. Pickard-Cambridge, 1873 – Europe, Turkey, Caucasus, Russia (Europe to south Siberia), Iran, Central Asia, China
C. peregrinum Thorell, 1899 – Ivory Coast, Nigeria, Cameroon
C. pichoni Schenkel, 1963 – China
C. poonaense Majumder & Tikader, 1991 – India
C. potanini Schenkel, 1963 – China
C. punctipedellum Caporiacco, 1949 – Congo, Rwanda, Kenya
C. punctorium (Villers, 1789) (type) – Europe, Turkey, Caucasus, Russia (Europe to south Siberia), Iran, Central Asia
C. punjabense Sadana & Bajaj, 1980 – India
C. ransoni Lotz, 2014 – Madagascar
C. rehobothense Strand, 1915 – Israel
C. rothi Lotz, 2014 – Madagascar
C. ruandana (Strand, 1916) - Rwanda 
C. rupicola (Thorell, 1897) – Myanmar, China, Indonesia
C. russellsmithi Lotz, 2007 – Ethiopia
C. rwandense Lotz, 2011 – Rwanda
C. saccharanalis Mukhtar, 2015 – Pakistan
C. sadanai Tikader, 1976 - India
C. sakoemicum Roewer, 1938 – New Guinea
C. salsicola Simon, 1932 – France
C. sambii Patel & Reddy, 1991 – India
C. sansibaricum Strand, 1907 – Ivory Coast to Zanzibar
C. saraswatii Tikader, 1962 – India
C. schenkeli Caporiacco, 1949 – Kenya, Rwanda, Zimbabwe, Botswana, South Africa
C. seidlitzi L. Koch, 1864 – Mediterranean to Central Asia
C. seshii Patel & Reddy, 1991 – India
C. shilabira Lotz, 2015 – Congo, Kenya
C. shiluvanense Lotz, 2007 – South Africa
C. sikkimense Majumder & Tikader, 1991 – India, Bangladesh
C. silaceum Rainbow, 1897 – Australia (New South Wales)
C. simaoense Zhang & Yin, 1999 – China
C. simplex Thorell, 1899 – Cameroon, Nigeria
C. siwi El-Hennawy, 2001 – Egypt
C. solidum Zhang, Zhu & Hu, 1993 – China
C. soputani Merian, 1911 – Indonesia (Sulawesi)
C. spectabile (Thorell, 1887) – Myanmar
C. sphaericum Zhang, Zhu & Hu, 1993 – China
C. stratioticum L. Koch, 1873 – New Zealand, Australia (Tasmania)
C. streblowi L. Koch, 1879 – Russia (Middle and south Siberia)
C. striolatum Simon, 1878 – Western Mediterranean
C. subinsulanum Li & Zhang, 2019 - China
C. taegense Paik, 1990 – China, Korea, Japan
C. tagorei Biswas & Raychaudhuri, 2003 – Bangladesh
C. taiwanicum Chen, Huang, Chen & Wang, 2006 – China, Taiwan
C. tanmoyi Biswas & Roy, 2005 – India
C. tanzanense Lotz, 2015 – Tanzania
C. taprobanense Strand, 1907 – Sri Lanka
C. tenue L. Koch, 1873 – Australia (Queensland)
C. tetragnathoide Caporiacco, 1949 – Kenya
C. torricellianum Strand, 1911 – New Guinea
C. torsivum Chen & Huang, 2012 – Taiwan
C. triviale (Thorell, 1895) – India, Myanmar
C. trivittatum Simon, 1906 – India
C. truncatum (Thorell, 1895) – Myanmar
C. turanicum Kroneberg, 1875 – Uzbekistan, Tajikistan
C. turiae Strand, 1917 – Thailand to Australia (Queensland)
C. uncinatum Paik, 1985 – China, Korea
C. unicum Bösenberg & Strand, 1906 – Korea, Japan, China, Laos
C. vankhedei Marusik & Fomichev, 2016 – Mongolia
C. vansoni Lawrence, 1936 – Southern Africa
C. verdense Lotz, 2011 – Cape Verde Is.
C. virescens (Sundevall, 1833) – Europe, Caucasus, Russia (Europe to Far East), Iran, China
C. vorax O. Pickard-Cambridge, 1874 – India
C. warsai Mukhtar, 2015 – Pakistan
C. wiehlei Chrysanthus, 1967 – New Guinea
C. wilma (Benoit, 1977) – St. Helena
C. wuquan Yu & Li, 2020 - China
C. zebrinum Savelyeva, 1972 – Russia (south Siberia), Kazakhstan
C. zhejiangense Hu & Song, 1982 – China, Korea

See also 
 List of Cheiracanthiidae species
 List of spiders associated with cutaneous reactions

References

Further reading

External links 
 

 
Araneomorphae genera
Cosmopolitan spiders
Taxa named by Carl Ludwig Koch